This is a list of people with the given name Stephen or Steven:

Saints
 Saint Stephen (died c. 35), with the title of Protomartyr (lit. "first martyr") due to his distinct fate among the early Christians
 Stephen, one of the pair of Christian saints and martyrs Socrates and Stephen
 Stephen the Younger (ca. 715–765), Byzantine iconodule martyr
 Stephen I of Hungary (c. 965–1038), canonized in 1083
 Stephen of Obazine (1085–1154), Cistercian, first Abbot of Obazine Abbey, France
 Stephen Harding (died 1134), English, one of the founders of the Cistercian Order; Catholic saint
 Stephen III of Moldavia or Stephen the Great and Holy (c. 1432–1504)

Royalty
 Stephen, Prefect of Amalfi (died 898)
 Stephen of Armenia (died 1165), marshal, son of Leo I
 Francis Stephen, Holy Roman Emperor 
 Stephen Ákos, influential baron in the Kingdom of Hungary in the late 13th century and the early 14th century
 King Stephen of England or Stephen of Blois (c. 1096–1154), grandson of William the Conqueror
 Stephen I of Hungary (c. 965–1038), Grand Prince of the Magyars, first king of Hungary
 Stephen II of Hungary (1101–1131), elder son of King Coloman
 Stephen III of Hungary (1147–1172), eldest son of King Geza II
 Stephen IV of Hungary (c.1133–1165), third son of King Béla II
 Stephen V of Hungary (1239–1272), elder son of King Béla IV
 Stephen, Count Palatine of Simmern-Zweibrücken (1385–1459), son of King Rupert of Germany
 Stephen I of Moldavia (1394–1399), son of Costea
 Stephen II of Moldavia (died 1447), prince, son of Alexandru cel Bun
 Stephen III of Moldavia or Stephen the Great and Holy (c.1432–1504), son of Bogdan II
 Stephen Báthory of Poland (1533–1586), prince of Transylvania, king consort of Poland, grand duke consort of Lithuania
 Stephen Uroš I of Serbia (died 1277), son of Stefan Nemanjić
 Stephen Bocskai of Transylvania (1557–1606) prince of Transylvania and Hungary 
 Stjepan Držislav of Croatia (died 997), king 969–997
 Stjepan I of Croatia (died 1058), king 1030–1058
 Stjepan II of Croatia (died 1091), king 1089–1091, last member of the Trpimirović dynasty
 Ivan Stephen of Bulgaria (died after 1343), tsar 1330–1331
 Stephen Tomašević of Bosnia (died 1463), last sovereign from the Bosnian Kotromanić dynasty
 Stephen of Greece, Greece's current king and a very influential personality

Church figures (Stephen or Stephanus)
 Pope Stephen I (died 257), Bishop of Rome 254–257
 Pope-elect Stephen (died 752), elected Pope but died before being ordained
 Pope Stephen II (died 757), pope 752–757
 Pope Stephen III (720–772), pope 768–772
 Pope Stephen IV (died 817), pope 816–817
 Pope Stephen V (died 891), pope 885–891
 Pope Stephen VI (died 897), pope 896–897
 Pope Stephen VII (died 931), pope 929–931
 Pope Stephen VIII (died 942), German, pope 939–942
 Pope Stephen IX (c. 1020–1058), pope 1057–1058
 Esteban, bishop of Roman Catholic Archdiocese of Zaragoza, Spain, 1128 to 1130
 Ecumenical Patriarch Stephen I of Constantinople (867–893), patriarch 886 to 893
 Ecumenical Patriarch Stephen II of Constantinople, from Amasea, patriarch 925 to 928
 Stephanus I, Archbishop of Aquileia, Italy, c. 515
 Stephanus II, Patriarch of Grado, Italy, c. 670
 Steven J. Lopes (born 1975), Roman Catholic Bishop of the Personal Ordinariate of the Chair of Saint Peter
Bishop Stephanos, bishop of Malankara eparchy of USA and Canada

Others 

 Stephen (son of Kalomaria) (fl. 886–921), a relative of Empress Theodora and a high-ranking courtier in the Byzantine court 
 Stephen, pen name of Dom Orejudos (1933–1991), American erotic artist, dancer, and choreographer
 Stephanus of Byzantium, 6th century author of Ethnica, a geographical dictionary
 Stephanus, a pupil of Pasiteles ( 33 BCE), sculptor in the time of Caesar Augustus

A
 Stephen Adam (1848–1910), Scottish stained glass designer
 Stephen Adams (disambiguation), various people
 Stephen Adekolu (born 1989), Canadian football player
 Steven A. Adelson, American film and television director
 Stephen Adler (disambiguation), multiple people
 Stephen Adye (disambiguation), multiple people
 Steven Aftergood, American anti-secrecy activist and writer
 Stephen Akinmurele (1978-1999), British serial killer
 Stephen Alemais (born 1995), American baseball player
 Stephen Shepherd Allen (1882–1964), New Zealander lawyer, farmer, colonial administrator, & politician
 Stephen E. Ambrose (1936–2002), American historian, biographye, and author
 Stephen Amell (born 1981), Canadian actor
 Stephen K. Amos (born 1967), British stand up comedian and television personality
 Steven James Anderson (born 1964), American wrestler, actor, producer
 Steven Lee Anderson (born 1981), American preacher and conspiracy theorist
 Stephen P. Anderson (born 1967), American musician, songwriter, and painter
 Stephen Wayne Anderson (1953–2002), American serial killer
 Steven Andskär (born 1964), Swedish race car driver
 Steven "Steve" Angello (born 1982), Greek-Swedish DJ, record producer, remixer and record label owner, member of electronic band Swedish House Mafia
 Steven "Steve" Aoki (born 1977), Japanese musician, DJ, remixer and record producer
 Stephen Arigbabu (born 1972), German basketball coach and former player
 Stephen Armone (1899–1960), Sicilian-American organized criminal
 Steven F. Arnold (1943–1994), American artist and filmmaker
 Stephen F. Austin (1793–1836), American empresario
 Stephen Thomas Azar (born 1964), American singer, songwriter, guitarist, and philanthropist

B 
 Stephen James Backshall (born 1973), British television presenter, naturalist, and writer
 Steven W. Bailey (born 1971), American actor
 Stephen Baker (disambiguation), multiple people
 Steven Baker (disambiguation), multiple people
 Stephen Clark Balderson (born 1975), American film director
 Stephen Baldwin (born 1966), American actor
 Steve Ballmer, (born 1956), American executive and basketball team owner
 Stephen Bainbridge (born 1958), American law professor and writer
 Stephen H. Bancroft, American retired private school official and organizational executive
 Steven Craig Banks (born 1954), American actor, musician, comedian, and writer
 Stephen Kevin Bannon (born 1953), American businessman and political figure
 Stephen Barncard (born 1947), American record producer and sound engineer
 Stephen Barr (born 1953), American physicist and professor
 Steven "Steve" Barri (born 1942), American songwriter and record producer
 Steven Barron (born 1956), Irish-British filmmaker and author
 Stephen Barton (born 1982), British composer 
 Steven Bauer (born 1956), Cuban-American actor
 Stephen Bechtel Sr. (1900–1989), American company president
 Stephen Bechtel Jr. (1925–2021), American businessman, civil engineer, and company co-owner 
 Stephen Beck American artist, writer, toy designer and inventor
 Stephen Charles "Steve" Beck (1957–2015), English football club chairman
 Steven Beck, American guitarist and singer
 Stephen D. Behrendt, historian 
 Steven Beitashour (born 1987), Iranian footballer
 Stephen Belber (born 1967), American playwright, screenwriter, and film director
 Stephen Vincent Benét (1898–1943), American author
 Stephen J. Benkovic (born 1938), American chemist and professor
 Stephen M. Bennett, American businessman
 Stephen Allen Benson (1816–1865), 2nd President of Liberia
 Stephen Bent, English actor
 Stephen Bentil, Ghanaian professional footballer
 Steven N. Berk (born 1959), American lawyer and former judge
 Steven Berkoff, (born 1937), British author, playwright, and actor
 Steven Berkowitz (born 1958), American tech business executive
 Steven M. Berlin (born 1955), American saxophonist, keyboardist, and record producer
 Steven Bernstein (born 1958), American cinematographer, director, screenwriter, and author
 Steven "Jesse" Bernstein (1950–1991), American underground writer, performance artist, and actor
 Steven Best (born 1955), American activist and presenter
 Stephen Bett, English politician and former police chief
 Stephen L. Bettinger (1924–2010), American US Air Force flying ace
 Stephen Betts, British composer, songwriter, and musician
 Stephen Bienko (born 1979), American coach, athlete, and businessman
 Stephen Bienskie, American actor and singer
 Stephen Biesty (born 1961), British illustrator
 Bantu Stephen Biko (1946-1977), South African anti-apartheid activist
 Stephen Leo Bing (1965–2020), American businessman, philanthropist, and film producer
 Stephen Birch, Canadian health economist and professor
 Stephen Bishop (singer) (born 1951), American singer-songwriter, actor, and guitarist
 Stephen R. Bissette (born 1955), American comics artist, editor, publisher, and educator
 Steven Blankaart (1650–1704), Dutch physician, iatrochemist, entomologist, and translator
 Steven Blane, American rabbi
 Steven Jay Blum (born 1960), American voice actor
 Steven Bochco (1943–2018), American TV writer, author, and producer
 Steven Kenneth Bonnell II (born 1988), American Twitch streamer, political commentator, and YouTube personality
 Stephen "tWitch" Boss (1982-2022), American freestyle hip hop dancer, choreographer, actor, television producer, and TV personality
 Stephen R. Bough (born 1970), American federal judge
 Stephen Bowen (born 1964), United States Navy submariner and a NASA astronaut, second submariner to travel into space
 Stephen Elliott Boyd (born 1979), American lawyer and former DOJ official
 Stephen Phillip Bracks (born 1954), Australian politician and university administrator
 Stephen Bradbury (born 1954), British artist and illustrator
 Steven Gill Bradbury (born 1958), American attorney and former government official
 Steven John Bradbury (born 1973), Australian former Olympic speed skater 
 Stephen Branchflower, American retired state prosecutor
 Steven Brault (born 1992), American baseball player
 Stephen Breyer, (born 1938), Associate Justice on the Supreme Court of the United States
 Steven Brill (born 1950), American lawyer, journalist, and entrepreneur
 Steven Brill (born 1962), American actor, film producer, director, and screenwriter
 Stephen Brodsky (born 1979), American rock musician
 Steven Brody (died 1994), American jewelry business founder
 Stephen Decatur Bross (1813-1888), American settler
 Steven or Steve Brown (disambiguation), multiple people
 Steven or Stephen Brown (disambiguation), multiple people
 Stephen Brown-Fried, American stage director
 Steven Browne (born 1989), Australian footballer
 Stephen Roger Bruce (born 1960), English former footballer and football manager
 Steven Brust (born 1955), American novelist, singer-songwriter, and musician 
 Stephen Bruton (1948–2009), American actor and musician
 Stephen Bryant, English violinist
 Steven Mark Bryles (1957-2012), American politician and businessman
 Stephen Bunting (born 1984), Irish cricketer
 Stephen Bunting (born 1985), English professional darts player
 Steven Burke (born 1974), British video game composer, sound designer, and voice actor
 Stephen G. Burns, American lawyer and former government official
 Steven Michael Burns (born 1973), American actor, voice actor, singer, and musician
 Stephen Burton (born 1987), English professional darts player 
 Stephen Burton (born 1989), American former football player
 Steve Buscemi (born 1957), American actor, writer, director, producer
 Steven Butler, American comic book artist
 Stephen Byers (born 1953), English Labour Party politician, Secretary of State for Transport
 Stephen Byrne (born 1986), Irish artist and animator 
 Stephen Byrne (born 1992), Irish vlogger and television personality

C 
 Steven Harris Cahn (born 1947), American jazz guitarist
 Steven G. Calabresi (born 1958), American law professor and author
 Steven Caldwell (born 1980), Scottish former footballer, coach, and executive
 Stephen Calk (born 1964/1965), American bank founder and political figure
 Steven Callahan (born 1952), American author, naval architect, inventor, and sailor
 Steven J. Camp (born 1955), American singer, songwriter, and pastor
 Stephen Campbell Moore (born 1979), British actor
 Steven Canals (born 1980), American screenwriter and producer
 Stephen J. Cannell (1941–2010), American TV producer, writer, novelist, and actor
 Stephen Caracappa (born 1941), American federal convict and former police officer
 Stephen Antonio Cardenas (born 1974), American martial artist, musician, and actor
 Stephen Michael Cardwell (born 1950), Canadian retired ice hockey player
 Stephen Carley, American business executive
 Stephen Carlin, Scottish stand-up comedian and writer
 Stephen Carlson (born 1996), American football player
 Steven Norman Carlton (born 1944), American retired baseball player
 Stephen Carpenter (disambiguation), multiple people
 Steven or Stephen Carter (disambiguation), multiple people
 Stephen McConnell Case (born 1958), American entrepreneur, investor, businessman, and advocate
 Stephen Cassidy, American former union president, executive, and advocate
 Stephen Cassidy, Irish former Gaelic footballer
 Stephen H. Cassidy, American politician and advocate
 Steven Caulker (born 1991), English footballer 
 Steven James Centanni, American former news reporter
 Stephen J. Challacombe (born 1946), English professor of oral medicine, writer, and organizational executive
 Steven Chambers (born 1990), Australian baseball player
 Steven Curtis Chapman (born 1962), American singer, songwriter, record producer, actor, author, and activist
 Stephen Pendrill Charles, Australian judge
 Stephan Chase (1945-2019), British actor, audio producer, director
 Stephen Chbosky (born 1970), American novelist, screenwriter, and film director
 Steven N. S. Cheung (born 1935), Hong Konger-American economics professor and author
 Stephen Chow (born 1962), Hong Kong actor, comedian and director
 Stephen Clark (disambiguation), multiple people with name spelling variations
 Stephen Clarke-Willson, American computer scientist and video game producer
 Stephen Clarkson (1937–2016), Canadian political scientist, professor, and author
 Stephen Grover Cleveland (1837–1908), 22nd and 24th President of the United States
 Stephen Coate, British-American economist and professor 
 Stephen Coates, British singer and music producer
 Stephen Cochran (born 1979), American country music singer-songwriter
 Stephen or Steven Cohen (disambiguation), multiple people
 Stephen Cole (born 1971), English author and audio producer
 Stephen Colbert (born 1964), American comedian, television host, actor, and writer
 Stephen Colletti (born 1986), American actor and television personality
 Stephen Collins, multiple people
 Steven Colloton (born 1963), American federal court judge
 Stephen Comey (born 1963), English-Australian actor
 Steven Robert Comisar (born 30, 1961), American convicted fraud
 Steven Conrad (born 1968), American screenwriter, film producer and director
 Stephen Constantine (born 1947), British history professor
 Stephen Constantine (born 1962), English professional football coach and former player
 Stephen John Coogan (born 1965), English actor, comedian, producer, and screenwriter
 Stephen Lawrence Cooley (born 1947), American politician, attorney, former prosecutor
 Stephen Coonts (born 1946), American author and editor
 Steven Corbin (1953–1995), American author
 Stephen A. Corker (1830–1879), American lawyer, judge, confederate, and U.S. Representative
 Stephen Corrigan (1963–20??), missing Irish man who was found dead
 Stephen Corry (born 1951), Malaysian-British anthropologist and indigenous rights activist
 Stephen Costello (born 1981), American opera singer
 Stephen Cottrell (born 1958), English Archbishop of York and author
 Stephen Covey (1932–2012), American educator, author, businessman, and speaker
 Steven Cowley (born 1959), British theoretical physicist, international authority on nuclear fusion, and administrator
 Stephen Cox, multiple people
 Stephen Crabb (born 1973), British politician and government official
 Steven Marshall Crabb (born 1943), Australian former politician
 Stephen Paul "Steve" Crabb (born 1963), British former runner
 Stephen Craig (born 1967), Australian bobsledder
 Stephen L. Craig, American chemistry professor and organizational head
 Stephen Craigan (born 1976), Northern Irish former footballer
 Stephen Craigie (born 1990), English former snooker player
 Stephen Crainey (born 1981), Scottish former footballer
 Steven Cramer (born 1953), American poet
 Stephen Crane (1871–1900), American novelist and journalist
 Steven "Stevie" Crawford (1960–1963), American toddler, identified decades after death
 Steven Crea (born 1947), American federal convict
 Steven Crea Jr. (born 1972), American federal convict
 Stephen Crean (1947–1985), Australian public servant
 Steven Croft (disambiguation), multiple people
 Stephen Crohn (1946–2013), American genetically immune to HIV 
 Steven P. Croley, American lawyer, professor, and former government official
 Steven S. Crompton (born 1962), Canadian artist, author, and game/comic designer
 Steven Paul Crook (born 1983), Australian former cricketer and vocalist
 Steven Lee Cropper (born 1941), AKA "The Colonel", American guitarist, songwriter, and record producer
 Steven Kent Crosby (born 1950), American former professional football coach and player
 Steven Crouch (born 1977), Australian former rugby player
 Steven David Croudson (born 1980), English former footballer and coach 
 Steven Crowder (born 1987), American-Canadian political commentator and media host
 Steven Crowell, American philosopher and professor
 Stephen James Crowther (born 1957), English political figure, writer, and businessman
 Steven Culp (born 1955), American actor
 Stephen Curry (born 1988), American basketball player
 Stephen Thomas Curwood (born 1947), American journalist, author, public radio personality, and actor
 Stephen M. Cutler, American lawyer and former government official

D 
 Steven David Daines (born 1962), American politician, US Senator, and former corporate executive
 Stephen Daldry (born 1960), English director and producer
 Stephen Louis Dalkowski Jr. (1939–2020), American baseball player
 Steven DaLuz (born 1953), American artist
 Steven Damman (born 1952), American infant who disappeared
 Stephen Dando-Collins (born 1950), Australian author and novelist
 Stephen Daniele, artist and illustrator
 Steven L. Danver, American historian
 Stephen Heard Darden (1816–1902), American state legislator and Confederate officer
 Stephen Darlington (born 1952), British choral director and conductor
 Steven Davis, American business executive
 Steven De Petter (born 1985), Belgian retired footballer
 Steven E. de Souza (born 1947), American screenwriter, producer, and director of film and TV
 Stephen Decatur Sr. (1751–1808), British-American privateer, US Navy captain
 Stephen Decatur Jr. (1779–1820), American US naval officer and commodore
 Stefanos Dedas (born 1982), basketball head coach in the Israel Basketball Premier League
 Steven Dehler (born 1987), American model
 Stephen Delancey (disambiguation), multiple people
 Steven Leroy dePyssler (1919–2020), American officer in the United States Air Force
 Stephen Denmark (born 1996), American football player
 Steven Boghos Derounian (1918–2007), Bulgarian-American U.S. representative, attorney, and professor
 Stephen Deutsch (born 1945), American composer and professor
 Stephen Dick (born 1985), Scottish field hockey player 
 Steven J. Dick (born 1949), American astronomer, author, and historian of science
 Stephen Dillane (born 1957), English actor
 Stephen Dillard (born 1969), American state court judge
 Stephen John Ditko (1927–2018), American comics artist
 Stephen Dixon (born 1985), Canadian ice hockey player
 Stephen Dobyns (born 1941), American poet and novelist
 Stephen Donaldson (1946–1996), American political activist and writer
 Stephen R. Donaldson (born 1947), American novelist
 Steven Donziger (born 1961), American attorney and former journalist
 Stephen James Doocy (born 1956), American TV host, political commentator, and author
 Stephen W. Doran (born 1956), American former Massachusetts state legislator and convicted criminal
 Stephen Dorff (born 1973), American actor
 Stephen Wallace Dorsey (1842–1916), Reconstruction era member of the United States Senate
 Stephen Douglas (disambiguation), multiple people
 Steven Drench (born 1985), English footballer 
 Steven Drizin, American lawyer and professor
 Steven Drozd (born 1969), American musician, songwriter, composer, and actor
 Stephen J. Dubner (born 1963), American author, journalist, and podcast/radio host
 Stephen Duffy (born 1960), English musician, singer, and songwriter
 Steven Duggar (born 1993), American baseball player
 Steven Dunbar Jr. (born 1995), American football player
 Stephen Duncan (1787-1867), American plantation owner in the Antebellum South
 Stephen Dunifer (born 1952), American radio engineer and activist
 Stephen Dunn (disambiguation), multiple people
 Stephen Dunne (disambiguation), multiple people
 Steven Duren (born 1956), American singer-songwriter
 Stephen Dycus (born 1941), American law professor and author

E 
 Steven J. Eagle, American law professor and writer
 Stephen Tyree Early (1889–1951), American journalist and government official
 Steven Eckholdt (born 1961), American actor
 Steven Ediger (born 1956), American lawyer and former Kansas state legislator
 Steven Bradley Edlefsen (born 1985), American former baseball player
 Steven Eisman (born 1962), American businessman and investor
 Steven Elder, English actor and screenwriter
 Stephen Benton Elkins (1841–1911), American industrialist and political figure
 Stephen Elliott (disambiguation), various people
 Stephen Ellis (disambiguation), multiple people
 Steven Ellis (disambiguation), multiple people
 Stephen Elop (born 1963), Canadian businessman and technology executive
 Steven Emerson (born 1954), American journalist, author, and commentator
 Stephen Emmer (born 1958), Dutch composer, arranger, producer, sound designer and musician
 Steven Andrew Engel (born 1974), American lawyer who served in government
 Stephen Michael Erickson (born 1950), American novelist
 Steven Erikson (born 1959), Canadian novelist
 Steven Erlanger (born 1952), American journalist
 Stephen Thomas Erlewine (born 1973), American music critic and editor
 Stephen Antunes Eustáquio (born 1996), Canadian footballer
 Stephen R. Evans, (?–2017), Malaysian politician, public administrator, and author
 Stephen Eze (born 1994), Nigerian professional footballer

F 
 Stephen Farrelly (born 1978), Irish wrestler and actor
 Stephen Fearing (born 1963), Canadian singer-songwriter and musician
 Steven Fechter, American playwright and professor
 Stephen Anthony Ferlazzo Jr., American keyboard player
 Steven Fielding (born 1961), professor of political history and author
 Stephen Fincher (born 1973), American politician, former US representative
 Steven Findlay (born 1985), Scottish international rugby player
 Steven Fine historian of Judaism, professor, and author
 Steven Finitsis (born 1983), Australian former squash player
 Steven Finn (disambiguation), multiple people
 Steven Roger Fischer (born 1947), New Zealander linguist and author
 Steven Fish (born 1962), American professor of political science and author
 Stephen Fishbach (born 1979), American writer, consultant, and former reality show participant
 Steven Fisher (born 1963), American actor, director, producer and writer
 Steven Fisher (born 1965), British diplomat
 Steven Flanagan, American physician, professor, and medical director
 Stephen Flemmi (born 1934), American organized criminal
 Steven Fletcher (disambiguation), multiple people
 Steven Florio (1949–2007), American magazine publisher and business executive
 Stephen Flowers (born 1953), American author and occultist
 Stephen Fodor (born 1953), American biological scientist and businessman 
 Steven or Stephen Ford (disambiguation), multiple people
 Stephen Forde (1914–1992), English footballer
 Stephen Foster (1826–1864), American songwriter
 Stephen Foxwell, school administrator and teacher
 Stephen Frail (born 1969), Scottish footballer and coach 
 Stephen Frampton (born 1969), Irish sportsperson
 Stephen Francis, a convicted murderer in Singapore
 Stephen Robert Franken (1932–2012), American actor 
 Steven Frautschi (born 1933), American theoretical physicist and professor
 Stephen Frears (born 1941), English film and TV director and producer
 Stephen Freind (born 1944), American politician
 Steven French, American actor, television announcer, and voice actor
 Stephen Frey, American author and financier
 Stephen Frick (born 1964), American astronaut and a veteran of two Space Shuttle missions
 Stephen Friedman (born 1937), American former bank chairman and presidential advisor
 Steven Friedman (born 1953), South African academic, journalist, and activist
 Steven Fromholz (1945–2014), American entertainer and singer-songwriter 
 Stephen Fry (born 1957), British actor, comedian, and television presenter
 Steven Fuentes (born 1997), Panamanian professional baseball player
 Steven Fulop (born 1977), American politician, former marine
 Stephen Fung (born 1974), Hong Kong actor and director
 Steven Furlano (born 1998), Canadian soccer player
 Steven Furtick (born 1980), American pastor, songwriter, and author

G 
 Stephen Kendall Gadd (born 1945), American drummer, percussionist, and session musician
 Stephen Gaghan (born 1965), American screenwriter and director
 Stephen Gard, American law professor and editor
 Stephen Garlick (born 1959), British actor
 Stephen Garrett (born 1957), British film and television producer
 Stephen Ellis Garrett (1974–2008), AKA Static Major, American singer, songwriter, and record producer
 Stephen Gaskin (1935–2014), American counterculture icon, commune founder, spiritual teacher, political activist
 Steven Gault (born 1973), Canadian criminal, outlaw biker, and police informant
 Steven Geray (1904–1973), Hungarian-American actor, theater director, businessman
 Steven Gerrard (born 1980), English footballer
 Steven Gey (1956-2011), American legal scholar and editor
 Stephen Geyer (born 1950), American songwriter, guitarist, and TV writer
 Steven Gilborn (1936–2009), American actor and educator
 Stephen Gillers, American law professor 
 Steven R. Gilmore, artist and graphic designer
 Stephen Girard (1750–1831), American philanthropist, banker, and slave owner
 Steven M. Girvin, American physicist, professor, and organizational director
 Stephen Glass (born 1972), disgraced journalist known for fabricating numerous stories
 Stephen Kramer Glickman (born 1979), American actor
 Stephen H. Gloucester (1802–1850), American pastor and an organizer of the Underground Railroad
 Stephen C. Glover (born 1990), American screenwriter, rapper, actor, and producer
 Steven Gluzband (born 1952), American trumpeter
 Steven Gluckstein (born 1990), American gymnast and coach
 Stephen Goldin (born 1947), American author and former scientist
 Stephen Goldring (1908-1996), American businessman and philanthropist
 Steven F. Goldstone (born 1946), American business executive, board member, and attorney
 Steven Gonzales, American film editor
 Steven Goode, American lawyer and professor
 Stephen Goodin (born 1988), American football player
 Stephen Gorard, British professor and author
 Stephen Kendal Gordy (born 1975), American rapper, singer, songwriter, dancer, record producer and DJ
 Stephen Gould (born 1962), American operatic tenor
 Steven Charles Gould (born 1955), American science fiction author and teacher
 Stephen Jay Gould (1941–2002), American paleontologist, evolutionary biologist, and historian of science
 Stephen Graham (born 1982), American basketball player and coach
 Stephen Victor Graham (1874-1955), 18th Governor of American Samoa
 Stephen Grammauta (1916–2016), American organized criminal
 Steven B. Grant (born 1983), American attorney and mayor
 Steven Gray (disambiguation), several people
 Stephen A. D. Greaves Sr. (1817-1880), American army officer, plantation owner, lawyer, and state legislator
 Stephen A. D. Greaves Jr. (1854-1915), American planter and state legislator
 Steven or Stephen Green (disambiguation), multiple people
 Stephen Greenblatt (born 1943), American Shakespearean, literary historian, and author
 Steven or Stephen Greene (disambiguation), multiple people
 Steven Grieveson (born 1970), British serial killer
 Stephen Griffiths (born 1969), British serial killer and cannibal
 Stephen Joseph Grilli (born 1949), American former baseball player
 Steven D. Grimberg (born 1974), American federal court judge and former DOJ official
 Stephen B. Grimes (1927–1988), English production designer and art director
 Stephen H. Grimes (born 1927), American lawyer, jurist, and educator
 Steven "Clem" Grogan (born 1951), American convicted murderer part of the Manson Family
 Steven Grossman (1951–1991), American singer-songwriter
 Stephen Guarino (born 1975), American actor and comedian
 Steven Gubser (1972–2019), American physics professor
 Steven Guilbeault (born 1970), Canadian politician, environmentalist, and author
 Stephen Adly Guirgis (born 1965), American playwright, screenwriter, director, and actor
 Steven Gundry (born 1950), American doctor and author
 Stephen Gunzenhauser (born 1942), American music conductor
 Stephen K. Guolla (born 1973), Canadian retired ice hockey player
 Steven Robert Guttenberg (born 1958), American actor, author, producer, and director
 Stephen Gyllenhaal (born 1949), American film director and poet

H 
 Stephen Hackett (disambiguation), multiple people
 Stephen Hadley, multiple people
 Steven Haft (born 1949), American media executive, attorney, and film producer
 Stephen Hagan (disambiguation), multiple people
 Steven Hager (born 1951), American writer, journalist, filmmaker, and cannabis rights activist
 Stephen Haggard (1911–1943), British actor, writer and poet
 Stephen Hahn (disambiguation), multiple people
 Steven Hahn (born 1951), history professor and author
 Stephen G. Haines (1945–2012), American organizational theorist, management consultant, and author
 Stephen Hale, multiple people
 Stephen Hales, multiple people
 Steven, Stephen, or Steve Hall (disambiguation), multiple people
 Steven Hallard (born 1965), British archer
 Stephen Halliwell (disambiguation), multiple people
 Steven Hallworth (born 1995), English former snooker player
 Steven Vincent Hamas (1907–1974), American football player and boxer
 Steven Jon Hambleton (born 1961), Australian physician and organizational executive
 Stephen Hannock (born 1951), American painter
 Stephen Harper (born 1959), 22nd Prime Minister of Canada and one of the leaders of War in Afghanistan
 Stephen Harper (disambiguation), multiple people
 Stephen Hartke (born 1952), American composer
 Steven Hassan (born 1953), American author, educator, mental health counselor
 Stephen D. Hassenfeld (1942-1989),American businessman and the former CEO and chairman of Hasbro
 Stephen Hawking (1942–2018), British theoretical physicist
 Stephen Hawkins (born 1971), Australian rower
 Stephen Heard (1740–1815), American state governor, state legislator, and military officer
 Stephen Hendrie (born 1995), Scottish footballer 
 Stephen Hendry (born 1969), British snooker player
 Stephen R. Henley, American lawyer and Army colonel
 Stephen Hepburn (born 1959), British politician
 Stephen Herek (born 1958), American film director
 Steven L. Herman, American journalist and author
 Steven Herzberg (born 1957), English-Australian cricketer
 Stephen Higgins (disambiguation), multiple people
 Stephen Hill, American producer, creator and radio host
 Stephen Clancy Hill (1976–2010), American adult actor who killed a coworker
 Stephen Hillenburg (1961–2018), American cartoonist, animator and creator of SpongeBob SquarePants
 Stephen Hilton, English composer, record producer, YouTuber & influencer
 Steven M. Hilton (born 1950), American philanthropist
 Steven Hirsch (born 1961), business founder of an adult entertainment company
 Steven Ho (born 1973), American martial artist, stunt coordinator, and stuntman
 Steven Ho Chun-yin (born 1979), Hong Konger politician
 Stephen Hodges, English educator and school administrator
 Steven Hoefflin, American plastic surgeon
 Steven Hoffenberg (1945-2022), American financial criminal
 Steven Holcomb (1980–2017), American bobsledder 
 Stephen Holden (born 1941), American writer, music and film critic, and poet
 Stephen Dewar Holden (1870–1918), British engineer
 Stephen or Steve Holland (disambiguation), multiple people
 Stephen Hopkins (disambiguation), multiple people
 Stephen Hough (born 1961), British-Australian pianist, composer, and author
 Stephen James Howe (born 1947), English musician, songwriter and producer
 Steven Hull (born 1967), American artist 
 Stephen Huneck (1948–2010), American wood carving artist, furniture maker, painter, and author
 Steven Hutchinson (born 1968), German basketball coach and former player
 Steven Hyden (born 1977), American music critic and podcast host
 Steven Hydes (born 1986), English person found abandoned as an infant

I 
 Steven Ilous (born 1981), producer, director, and writer
 Steven Alan Inskeep (born 1968), American journalist, radio host, and author
 Stephen Ireland (born 1986), Irish former footballer
 Stephen James Irons (born 1958), Australian politician
 Steven or Stephen Irwin (disambiguation), multiple people
 Steven Douglas Israel (born 1969), former American football player
 Steven Isserlis (born 1958), British cellist and author
 Steven Izenour (1940–2001), American architect, urbanist, theorist, and educator

J 
 Steven or Stephen Jackson, multiple people
 Steven Allan Jensen (1955–2022), American ice hockey player, hockey camp owner, and hockey instructor
 Stephen Jenyns (1450–1523), English merchant and school founder
 Steven B. Jepson (born 1960), American opera singer and acting coach
 Stephen S. Jewett (1858–1932), American lawyer and New Hampshire state legislator
 Steven Jobs (1955-2011), American business magnate, industrial designer, investor, media proprietor, executive and co-founder of Apple Inc. and CEO of NeXT, pioneer of the personal computer revolution
 Stephen Joffe (born 1991), Canadian actor and singer
 Stephen Johnson (disambiguation), multiple people
 Steven Johnson (disambiguation), multiple people
 Stephen Jones (disambiguation), multiple people
 Stephen, Steven, or Steve Jordan (disambiguation), multiple people
 Stephen Joyce (disambiguation), multiple people
 Stephen Juba (1914–1993), Canadian politician
 Steven Timothy Judy (1956–1981), American mass murderer and suspected serial killer

K 
 Stephen Kalinich (born 1942), American poet and music collaborator
 Stephen Kaltenbach (born 1940), American artist and author
 Stephen Kaplan (1940–1995), paranormal investigator, organizational executive, and author
 Stephen Kaplan, American professor of psychology 
 Steven Kaplan, American businessman and team owner
 Stephen P. Karns, American lawyer
 Stephen M. Katz, American cinematographer
 Stephen T. Kay (born 1963), American actor, director, and writer 
 Steven Kay, British international criminal lawyer
 Stephen Kaye (born 1951), Australian judge 
 Stephen Kean (born 1967), Scottish football manager and former player
 Stephen F. Keating (1918–2001), American technology executive and attorney
 Stephen Paul Keirn (born 1951), American retired professional wrestler
 Steven Kellogg (born 1941), American author and illustrator
 Stephen Kellogg (born 1976), American singer-songwriter
 Stephen Wright Kellogg (1822–1904), American politician, attorney, military officer and judge
 Stephen Kenny, Australian lawyer
 Stephen A. Kent, Canadian professor of sociology and author
 Stephen Kerr (born 1960), British politician
 Stephen Douglas Kerr (born 1965), American basketball coach and former player 
 Steven Kerr (born 1989), Scottish former footballer 
 Steven Khalil, Australian bridal and fashion designer
 Steven R. Kidd (1911–1987), American illustrator, instructor, and deacon
 Stephen King (born 1947), American author
 Steven Kinney (born 1987), American soccer player
 Steven Kinniburgh (born 1989), Scottish former footballer and manager
 Stephen Alan Kipner (born 1950), American-born Australian songwriter and record producer
 Steven Kirby (born 1977), English former cricketer, cricket and bowling coach
 Steven Thomas Kirby (born 1952), former Lieutenant Governor of South Dakota
 Steven Klein, multiple people
 Steve Knapman, Australian television producer
 Steven or Steve Knight (disambiguation), multiple people
 Steven Koecher (born 1979), American man who disappeared 
 Stephen F. Kolzak, casting director and activist
 Stephen Kosgei Kibet (born 1986), Kenyan runner
 Stephen V. Kobasa (born 1948), American teacher, journalist, and Christian political activist
 Stephen Kotkin (born 1959), American historian, academic, and author
 Steven Kotler (born 1967), American author, journalist, and entrepreneur
 Stephen Kovacs (1972–2022), saber fencer and fencing coach, charged with sexual assault, died in prison
 Stephen F. Kroft (born 1945), American retired journalist
 Steven Wynn "Steve" Kubby (born 1946), American political activist and author
 Stephen S. Kudla (born 1950), American mathematician and professor
 Steven T. Kuykendall (1947–2021), American politician and member of the U.S. House of Representatives
 Steven Kwan (born 1997), American baseball player

L 
 Stephen Lack (born 1946), Canadian artist, actor, and screenwriter 
 Stephen N. Lackey (born 1980), American philanthropist and political fundraiser 
 Steven or Steve Lacy (disambiguation), multiple people
 Stephen P. Laffey (born 1962), American politician, businessman, and author
 Stephen Paul Lamacq (born 1964), English disc jockey
 Stephen Lambert (disambiguation), multiple people
 Steven Lampier (born 1984), British cyclist
 Steven Landek (born 1955), American politician
 Stephen James Lander (born 1947), British intelligence officer, administrator, & academic
 Stephen Landesberg (1936–2010), American actor, comedian, and voice actor
 Steven E. Landsburg (born 1954), American professor of economics and author
 Stephen Lang (born 1952), American screen and stage actor, and playwright
 Steven Lang (born 1987), Swiss footballer
 Steven or Stephen Langdon (disambiguation), multiple people
 Stephen Langlois, American chef and author
 Stephen Langridge, British stage and opera director
 Stephen Langton (c.1150–1228), English Catholic cardinal, archbishop, and writer
 Steven Daniel Langton (born 1984), American bobsledder
 Stephen R Lankton (born 1947), American psychotherapist, lecturer, author, and journal editor
 Stephen Philip Lansdown (born 1952), English businessman and sports team owner
 Stephen Lanza (born 1957), American retired US Army lieutenant general
 Stephen Laurence, British scientist and philosopher
 Stephen R. Lawhead (born 1950), American fiction and non-fiction author
 Stephen Lawrence (disambiguation), multiple people
 Stephen Leacock (1869–1944), Canadian teacher, political scientist, author, and humourist
 Stephen D. Lebovitz (born 1962), American business executive
 Stephen Ledogar (1929–2010), American ambassador and diplomat
 Steven or Stephen Lee (disambiguation), multiple people
 Stephen Lee Hock Khoon, a convicted murderer in Singapore
 Stephen Leone (born 1948), American chemist and professor
 Stephen Leopold (born 1951), Canadian real estate businessman
 Stephen R. Leopold, American former state legislator
 Steven Levenson (born 1984), American playwright and television writer
 Steven Levitan (born 1962), American television producer, director, and screenwriter
 Steven Levitsky (born 1968), American political scientist, professor, and author
 Steven David Levitt (born 1967), American economist, professor, and writer
 Stephen Lewis (1926–2015), English actor, comedian, director, screenwriter and playwright
 Steven V. Ley (born 1945), English professor of chemistry
 Stephen Decatur Lindsey (1828–1884), American politician and lawyer
 Steven Lindsey (born 1960), retired U.S. Air Force officer and NASA astronaut, Chief of the NASA Astronaut Office 
 Stephen N. Limbaugh Jr. (born 1952), American federal judge
 Stephen N. Limbaugh Sr. (born 1927), American former federal judge
 Stephen J. Lippard (born 1940), American professor and researcher in chemistry fields
 Stephen Lipson (born 1954), English record producer, audio engineer, guitarist, and songwriter
 Steven Lisberger (born 1951), American film director, producer, and writer
 Stephen Martin Lomas (born 1974), Northern Irish football manager and former footballer
 Steven James Lomasney (born 1977), American former baseball player
 Steven M. Lopez (born 1953), American journalist 
 Stephen R. Lorenz (born 1951), American retired US Air Force general and organizational executive
 Steven Lubet, American legal scholar and author
 Steven Lugerner, American musician
 Steven Lukather, American guitarist, singer, songwriter, arranger and record producer
 Stephen Lungu (1942–2021), Zimbabwean evangelist
 Stephen Lush (1753–1825), American lawyer, military officer, and state legislator
 Stephen Lusher (born 1945), Australian former legislator
 Stephen Lushington (disambiguation), multiple people
 Stephen Richard Lyman (born 1982), American jazz drummer, composer, and educator
 Stephen Lynch (disambiguation), multiple people

M 
 Steven Machat (born 1952), American lawyer, entertainment mogul, and producer
 Stephen James "Steve" Mackall (born 1959), Canadian-American voice actor, voice-over announcer, comedian, director, screenwriter, and songwriter
 Steven "Steve" MacLean (born 1954), Canadian astronaut
 Stephen Maguire (born 1981), Scottish snooker player
 Stephen Malik, American team owner and executive
 Stephen Malkmus (born 1966), American indie rock musician
 Stephen Mallan (born 1967), Scottish former footballer
 Stephen Patrick Mallan (born 1996), Scottish footballer 
 Stephen Mallatratt (1947–2004), English playwright, television screenwriter, and actor
 Stephen Mallinder (born 1955), English artist, musician, writer, and academic
 Stephen Mallinga (1943–2013), Ugandan medical doctor, government official, and politician
 Stephen Mallon (born 1999), Northern Irish professional footballer 
 Stephen Mallory (1812 – November 9, 1873), American US Senator, later Confederate Navy Secretary
 Stephen Mallory II (1848–1907), American US Representative and US Senator
 Stephen Arnold "Steve" Mandell (1941–2018), American bluegrass guitarist and banjoist
 Steven Mandis (born 1970), American investor, executive, educator, and author
 Stephen James Mangan (born 1968), English actor, writer, comedian and presenter
 Stephen Marche (born 1976), Canadian author, essayist, and cultural commentator
 Stephen Marchesi (born 1951), American artist and illustrator
 Stephen Marchionda, American classical guitarist
 Stephen Marcus (born 1962), British actor
 Stephen Marcussen, American music engineer and producer
 Steven Marković (born 1985), Australian basketball player
 Steven M. Martin (born 1954), American actor and filmmaker
 Steven Matz (born 1991), American baseball player
 Stephen McCoy (1948-1989), American convicted murderer
 Stephen McEveety (born 1954), American film producer
 Stephen Joseph McGroarty (1830–1870), Irish American soldier
 Stephen McHattie (born 1946), Canadian actor
 Stephen LaTreal McNair (1973–2009), American professional football quarterback
 Stephen Anthony McNallen (born 1948), American new religious movement leader and activist
 Stephen McNally (born 1911–1994), American actor
 Stephen Patrick McNally (born 1978), English singer and songwriter
 Stephen McNeff (born 1951), British composer
 Stephen McNeilly (born 1968), English artist, writer, and editor
 Stephen McNichols (1914–1997), American politician
 Steven McNicoll, Scottish actor, director, playwright and television presenter
 Steven McRae (born 1985), Australian ballet and tap dancer
 Stephen Mear (born 1964), English dancer, choreographer, and director
 Stephen Meeks (born 1970), American state politician
 Steven Menashi (born 1979), American federal court judge and former government official
 Steven Douglas Merryday (born 1950), American federal judge
 Steven Michael Mesler (born 1978), American bobsledder and non-profit executive
 Stephen Metcalf (born 1964), American columnist and podcaster
 Steven Mierdman (c.1510–1559), Dutch publisher of Reformation books
 Steven Meisel (born 1954), American fashion photographer
 Stephen Merchant (born 1974), British writer, director, radio presenter, and actor
 Stephan P. Mickle (1944–2021), American federal court judge
 Stephen Miller (1816-1881), fourth governor of U.S. state Minnesota
 Stephen Miller (writer) (born 1941), American author
 Stephen Miller (born 1985), former White House adviser and speechwriter
 Steven C. Miller (born 1981), American screenwriter, editor, and director
 Steven Haworth Miller (born 1943), American guitarist, singer and songwriter
 Stephen James Miller (born 1980), British para-athlete
 Stephen Milligan (1948–1994), British politician and journalist
 Stephen Milling (born 1965), Danish operatic bass 
 Stephen C. Miner (born 1951), American film and TV director
 Steven Mitchell (American football) (born 1994), American football player
 Steven Mnuchin (born 1962), 77th United States Secretary of the Treasury
 Steven William Moffat (born 1961), Scottish television writer and producer
 Steven Molaro (born 1972), American television producer and writer
 Steven Monroe (born 1972), American actor, comedian, and psychotherapist
 Steven R. Monroe (born 1964), American film director and writer
 Stephen Campbell Moore (born 1979), British actor
 Steven Dean Moore, American animation director
 Stephen Morin (1951–1985), American serial killer
 Stephen Morris (musician) (born 1957), British drummer and musician
 Steven Patrick Morrissey (born 1959), English singer, songwriter, and author
 Stephen J. Morse, American law professor
 Steven W. Mosher (born 1948), American social scientist and author
 Stephen Moyer (born 1969), English film and television actor
 Stephen Mulhern (born 1977), English television presenter, magician, comedian, and actor

N 
 Steven R. Nagel (1946-2014), American astronaut, aeronautical and mechanical engineer, test pilot, and US Air Force pilot
 Steven Naifeh (born 1952), American author and artist
 Steven Naismith (born 1986), Scottish former footballer and volunteer
 Stephen Nash (disambiguation), multiple people
 Stephen Nedoroscik (born 1998), American artistic gymnast
 Stephen "Steve" Nemesh (1896–1975), Hungarian-American racecar driver
 Steven Neuberg, American psychology professor, author, and editor
 Stephen Malcolm Ronald Nice (born 1951), English singer and songwriter
 Stephen Nichols (born 1951), American actor
 Stephen Nichols (born 1963), former Australian rules footballer
 Stephen G. Nichols (born 1936), American professor and medievalist
 Steven Nissen (born 1948), American cardiologist, researcher, and patient advocate
 Steven Norris (born 1945), British politician and businessman
 Stephen L. Norris, American business executive and former government official
 Stephen Mark Norris (born 1961), English former footballer 
 Steven Novella (born 1964), American clinical neurologist, professor, author, and skeptic
 Steven Nzonzi (born 1988), French footballer

O 
 Stephen O'Donnell (born 1983), Scottish footballer 
 Stephen O'Donnell (born 1986), Irish professional football coach and former player 
 Stephen O'Donnell (born 1992), Scottish professional footballer
 Stephen O'Malley (born 1974), American guitarist, producer, composer, and visual artist 
 Stephen B. Oates (1936–2021), American history professor and author
 Steven Okert (born 1991), American baseball player
 Steven Old (born 1986), New Zealand footballer
 Steven Oleksy (born 1986), American professional ice hockey player
 Steven Robert Olin (1965–1993), American baseball pitcher
 Steven or Stephen Oliver (disambiguation), multiple people
 Steven Olson (born 1947), American politician, state legislator
 Stephen Omony (born 1980), Ugandan basketball player
 Steven Oo (born 1984), Burmese-American TV personality and fashion designer
 Stephen S. Oswald (born 1951), former NASA astronaut

P 
 Stephen B. Packard (1839–1922), American governor of a US state
 Stephen Paddock (1953-2017), American mass murderer and perpetrator of the 2017 Las Vegas shooting
 Steven Page (born 1970), Canadian musician, singer, and songwriter
 Steven Parker (disambiguation), multiple people
 Steven Paterson (born 1975), Scottish former politician
 Stephen Paul (born 1951), American woodworker, distiller, and businessman
 Stephen Paulus (1949–2014), American composer
 Stephen Pearce (1819–1904), English painter
 Stephen John "Stevo" Pearce (born 1962), British record producer and music executive
 Steven Wayne Pearce (born 1983), American former baseball player
 Stephen Pears (born 1962), English former footballer and coach
 Steven Peikin, American lawyer and SEC official
 Stephen Hyatt Pell (1874–1950), American coin collector and history enthusiast
 Steven Pemberton, researcher in computer science and coding
 Steven James Pemberton (born 1967), British actor, comedian, director, and writer
 Balasuriyage Steven Perera (1924-1982), Sri Lankan Sinhala, actor, director, and vocalist
 Stephen Perkins (born 1967), American musician and songwriter
 Stephen J. Perry (1954–2010), American writer of cartoons and comic books
 Stephen R. Perry (born 1950), Canadian legal scholar and professor
 Stephen Samuel Perry (1825–1874), American settler and plantation manager
 Stephen Peters (1912–1976), Canadian politician
 Stephen J. "Steve" Peters (born 1963), Canadian former politician and business executive
 Stevan Petrović (1807-1855), Serbian military commander, known as Stevan Knićanin
 Steven Pienaar (born 1982), South African former footballer and coach
 Stephen Rowland Pierce (1896–1966), English architect and town planning consultant
 Steven Pinker (born 1954), American cognitive scientist and popular science author
 Steven Pitt, multiple people
 Stephen 'Steve' Poleskie (1938–2019), artist and author
 Stephen Poliakoff (born 1952), British playwright, director and screenwriter
 Steven Earl Popkes (born 1952), American science fiction writer
 Steven "Steve" Porcaro (born 1957), American keyboardist, singer and songwriter, one of the founding members of the rock band Toto
 Stephen Porges (born 1945), American psychiatrist and neuroscientist
 Stephen Port (born 1975), British serial killer
 Stephen Porter, British professor of oral medicine
 Stephen Potts (born 1957), British author and writer
 Steven John Potts (born 1967), English football coach and former player
 Stephen Bosworth Pound (1833–1911), American lawyer, politician, and judge
 Stephen Prina (born 1954), American artist and professor
 Steven Prince, American road manager and actor
 Stephen Punt (born 1962), British comedian, writer, and actor

R 
 Stephen Hall Railsback (born 1945), American actor
 Stephen James Randall, Canadian professor, author, and activist
 Stephen John Randall (born 1980), English former cricketer
 Stephen Randolph (born 1974), American baseball player
 Steven Raucci (born 1948), American convicted criminal
 Stephen Rea (born 1946), Irish actor
 Steven Rea, American journalist, film critic, web producer, and writer
 Stephen M. Reasoner (1944–2004), American former federal judge 
 Stephen Lester Reeves (1926–2000), American professional bodybuilder, actor, and philanthropist
 Stephen Regelous, New Zealander computer graphics software engineer
 Stephen Michael Reich (born 1936), American composer 
 Steven Reich, American attorney, former DOJ employee, and CEO
 Stephen Rennicks, Irish musician and composer
 Steven Reuther (1951–2010), American film producer
 Stephen Reynolds, Canadian television director
 Stephen Dee Richards (1856–1879), American serial killer 
 Stephen L Richards (1879–1959), American lawyer, professor, and LDS Church leader 
 Steven Riley, British professor of infectious disease 
 Steven Ritch (1921-1995), American actor
 Stephen E. Rivkin, American film editor, producer, and organizational head
 Steven Robertson (born 1977), Scottish actor
 Stephen C. Robinson (born 1957), American lawyer and former judge
 Stephen Roche (born 1959), Irish road racing cyclist
 Stephen Roche (born 1964), New Zealander composer and performer
 Steven Clark Rockefeller (born 1936), American philanthropist, professor, and author
 Steven Rogelberg, American psychologist, professor, author, and editor
 Stephen Root (born 1951), American actor
 Steven Rosefielde (born 1942), American professor and author
 Steven J. Rosen, American political lobbyist
 Steven Rosenbaum, American author, entrepreneur, nonprofit director, and filmmaker
 Steven Rosenberg (born 1940), American physician, cancer researcher, and surgeon
 Steven Rosenblum, American film editor
 Stephen Rosenfeld (1932–2010), American journalist, editor, and columnist
 Steven Rosengard, American fashion designer
 Steven Rothery (born 1959), English musician
 G. Steven Rowe (born 1953), American lawyer, politician, and organizational executive
 Steven Rudy (born 1978), American state politician and business owner
 Steven Rumbelow (1949−2016), British theatre and film director and producer

S 
 Stephen Sachs (born 1959), American stage director and playwright
 Stephen H. Sachs (1934–2022), American lawyer and politician
 Stephen Sackur (born 1964), British journalist
 Stephen Sadowski (born 1967), Canadian artist specializing in comics
 Steven Salaita (born 1975), American scholar, author and public speaker
 Steven Sater, American poet, lyricist, playwright, and screenwriter
 Steven Savile (born 1969), British author and editor
 Steven P. Schinke (1945–2019), American academic
 Steven Ralph Schirripa (born 1957), American actor, producer, author, voice artist, and businessman
 Stephen Edward Schmidt (born 1970), American public relations and political strategist
 Steven J. Schmidt, American political and environmental activist
 Stephen Schwartz (disambiguation), multiple people with name spelling variations
 Stephen A. Schwarzman (born 1947), American business executive
 Steven Seagal (born 1952), American actor
 Steven Sebring (born 1966), American photographer, filmmaker and producer
 Stephen Seche (born 1952), US ambassador to Yemen
 Stephen Sedgwick, British mix engineer
 Stephen Sedley (born 1939), British lawyer
 Stephen Semel, American filmmaker and actor
 Stephen Sesnick, club owner and band manager 
 Steven Sessegnon (born 2000), English professional footballer 
 Steven Severin (born 1955), English songwriter, composer, multi-instrumentalist, and producer
 Stephen H. Shagan (1927–2015), American novelist, screenwriter, and television and film producer
 Stephen Shaw (born 1953), British prison ombudsman and investigator
 Stephen Shen (born 1949), Taiwanese politician and previous government official
 Stephen Shenker (born 1953), American theoretical physicist and professor
 Stephen Shennan, British archaeologist and academic
 Stephen Ross Shennan (born 1991), New Zealander rugby player
 Stephen B. Shepard (born 1939), American business journalist and academic
 Stephen Shepherd, Canadian literature professor
 Stephen Shepich (1948–2013), American state politician and convict
 Stephen Lea Sheppard (born 1983), Canadian writer and former actor
 Stephen M. Sheppard (born 1963), American law professor, legal historian, and author
 Stephen Sidelinger (born 1947), American designer, educator, and book artist
 Stephen de Silva Jayasinghe (1911-1977), Sri Lankan Sinhala politician
 Steven Silver (actor) (born 1989), American actor
 Stephen Simpson (1789–1854), American author, journalist, and editor
 Steven Sims (born 1997), American football player
 Stephen Sinclair, New Zealander playwright, screenwriter, and novelist
 Stephen Six (born 1965), American lawyer, former judge, and former state Attorney General
 Steven L. Sles (born 1940), American artist, composer and musician
 Stephen Smale (born 1930), American mathematician 
 Stephen B. Small (1947–1987), American businessman
 Stephen A. Smith (born 1949), American communications professor, author, part of Whitewater Scandal
 Steven Paul Smith (1969–2003), American singer-songwriter and musician known as Elliott Smith 
 Steven Soderbergh (born 1963), American film director
 Steven Soles, American singer-songwriter, record producer, and guitarist
 Steven Solomon (born 1993), Australian sprinter
 Stephen Sommers (born 1962), American film director and screenwriter
 Stephen Sondheim (1930–2021), American theatre composer and lyricist
 Steven Sotloff (1983–2014), American-Israeli journalist
 Stephen Roger Southwood (born 1955), Australian judge
 Steven Souza Jr. (born 1989), American baseball player
 Stephen Speed (born c. 1963), former mayor and retired U.S. Naval officer
 Stephen Spencer, English DJ & producer
 Stephen Spender (1909–1995), English poet, novelist, essayist, and professor
 Steven Spielberg (born 1946), American film director and producer, one of the most popular in film history
 Stephen Spinella (born 1956), American actor
 Stephen Spiro (1939–2007), American political activist
 Stephen C. Spiteri (born 1963), Maltese military historian
 Stephen Sprouse (1953–2004), American fashion designer and artist
 Steven Spurrier (1941–2021), British wine expert, merchant, and author
 Stephen Squeri (born 1959), American corporate executive and board member
 Steven Stamkos (born 1990), Canadian ice hockey player, captain of Tampa Bay Lightning of the National Hockey League (NHL)
 Steven Stanley (born 1958), Jamaican music producer and musician
 Steven M. Stanley (born 1941), American professor of paleontology and evolutionary biology
 Steven Staples (born 1966), Canadian policy analyst, organizational executive, and writer
 Stephen Staunton (born 1969), Irish football manager and former player
 Stephen "Stepa" Stepanović (1856-1929), Serbian military commander during First Balkan War
 Stephen Owen Stephens (1930–2021), American television broadcaster and producer
 Stephen Stevens (1793-1870), American Justice of the Indiana Supreme Court, abolitionist
 Stephen Arthur Stills (born 1945), American singer, songwriter, and musician
 Steven Stivers (born 1965), American businessman and politician
 Stephen Samuel Stratton (1840–1906), English organist and author
 Stephen E. Straus (1946–2007), American physician, immunologist, virologist, and science administrator
 Stephen B. Streater (born 1965), British technology entrepreneur
 Stephen Street (born 1960), English music producer
 Stephen Sullivan (disambiguation), multiple people
 Stephen Swartz, (born 1991), American electronic-music artist, known mononymously as "Stephen"
 Stephen Sugarman, American law professor
 Stephen Sulyk (1924–2020), Ukrainian-American archbishop
 Steven Sund, American police officer & former US Capitol Police chief
 Stevan Šupljikac (1786-1848), Serbian voivode (military commander) and the first Voivode of the Serbian Vojvodina
 Stephen Susco (born 1974), American screenwriter, producer, and director
 Stephen Susman (1941–2020), American lawyer
 Stephen Swad, American business executive and accountant 
 Steven Douglas Symms (born 1938), American politician and lobbyist
 Stephen Széchenyi (1791-1860), Hungarian politician, political theorist, writer, and statesman dubbed "the Greatest Hungarian"

T 
 Stephen Tashjian (born 1959), American artist, puppeteer, and singer
 Stephen Tennant (1906–1987), British socialite
 Stephen Thomas (disambiguation), multiple people
 Steven Thomas (disambiguation), multiple people
 Steven, Stephen or Steve Thompson (disambiguation), multiple people
 Stephen Thorne (1935–2019), British actor
 Stephen Timms (born 1955), British politician
 Stephen Tobin (1836–1905), Canadian merchant and politician
 Stephen A. Tolbert (1921–1975), Liberian politician and businessman
 Stephen Tobolowsky (born 1951), American actor, writer, director, and musician
 Stephen Tompkins (born 1971), American artist, animator, and composer 
 Stephen Tompkinson (born 1965), English actor, narrator, & director
 Stephen Tong (born 1940), Chinese-Indonesian pastor, teacher, author, and songwriter
 Stephen Totter (1963-2019), American operatic baritone and horn player
 Stephen Toulmin (1922–2009), British philosopher, author, and educator
 Steven Tsuchida, American film and television director
 Stephen Trask, American composer
 Steven Truscott (born 1945), Canadian man, wrongly convicted for murder
 Stephen Johnson Turre (born 1948), American jazz musician, composer, arranger, and educator
 Steven Tyler (born 1948), American singer, songwriter, musician, and actor

U 
 Stephen Ucci (born 1971), American politician and Rhode Island state legislator
 Stephen Ullmann (1914–1976), Hungarian-British linguist and philologist
 Stephen Underwood (born 1975), American drummer
 Stephen Updegraff (born 1962), American innovative eye surgeon and organization board member
 Stephen Uppal (born 1978), English actor
 Stephen Urban (born 1952), American local councilmember and former Pennsylvania legislator
 Stephen Urice (born 1950), American lawyer, lecturer, and archeologist

V 
 Stephen Vaden (born 1982), American federal court judge and former government official
 Steven Siro Vai (born 1960), American guitarist, composer, singer, songwriter, and producer
 Steven Van Zandt (born 1950), American musician, singer, songwriter, and actor
 Stephen Vaughn, American lawyer and former US Trade Representative
 Stephen M. Veazey, American religious group leader
 Steven Victor, Haitian-American record executive and artist manager
 Steven Vincent (1955–2005), American author and journalist
 Stephen Viscusi, American author, columnist, and broadcast journalist
 Stephen Vitiello, American visual and sound artist, former guitarist
 Steven Vitória (born 1987), Canadian professional soccer player

W 
 Stephen or Steve Wallace (disambiguation), multiple people
 Stephen Wallem (born 1968), American actor and singer
 Stephen Martin Walt (born 1955), American professor of international affairs 
 Steven T. Walther (born 1943), American attorney and government official
 Stephen Warbeck (born 1953), English composer and director
 Steven Warner, visual effects supervisor
 Stephen M. Watt, computer scientist, mathematician, researcher working in academia
 Stephen Wayda (born 1946), American professional photographer
 Stephen Webb (disambiguation), multiple people
 Steven Webb (born 1984), English actor
 Steven Weber (born 1961), American actor, voice actor, comedian and singer 
 Stephen Webster (born 1959), British jewellery designer
 Stephen W. Webster (born 1943), American attorney, politician, and woodland manager
 Steven Weinberg (1933–2021), American theoretical physicist and author
 Steven Weiss (disambiguation), various people
 Steven Weissman (born 1968), American alternative cartoonist
 Stephen C. West (born 1952), British biochemist and molecular biologist
 Stephen Girard Whipple (1823-1895), American 49er, newspaper editor, politician, and Union officer 
 Stephen M. White (1853–1901), American politician and US Senator
 Stephen J. Whitfield (born 1942), American professor of American politics, culture, & history
 Stephen Whittle (born 1955), British legal scholar, professor, activist, and organizational executive
 Stephen Wild (born 1981), English rugby footballer
 Stephen Wildman (born 1951), British art history professor
 Steven S. Wildman, American professor, researcher, author, and editor
 Stephen Earl Wilhite (1948–2022), American computer scientist
 Steve Wilks (born 1969), American football coach and former player
 Steven John Wilkos (born 1964), American talk show host and military veteran
 Stephen Williams (disambiguation), several people
 Stephen Wilson (disambiguation), several people
 Steven or Steve Wilson (disambiguation), several people
 Steven Windmueller, American professor of Jewish studies and author
 Stephen Ralph Windom (born 1949), American attorney and state politician 
 Stephen Winn (born 1959), English former footballer 
 Steven Winter, American law professor
 Stephen Lawrence Winwood (born 1948), English singer, songwriter, and musician
 Steven or Stephen Wise (disambiguation), multiple people
 Steven Gene Wold (born 1951), American musician and producer
 Steven D. Wolens (born 1950), former Texas state legislator
 Stephen Wolfram (born 1959), British-American computer scientist and businessman
 Stephen Wooldridge (1977–2017), Australian racing cyclist
 Steven Wormald (born 1946), explorer and surveyor of the Antarctic and Arctic 
 Stephen Gary Wozniak (born 1950), American programmer and co-founder of Apple Inc.
 Steve Woznick (born 1949), American athlete
 Steven Wright (born 1955), American comedian, actor, writer, and film producer
 Steven Gerald James Wright (born 1958), English serial killer
 Stephen Alan Wynn (born 1942), American real estate businessman
 Steven Lawrence Wynn (born 1960), American singer, songwriter, and musician

Y 
 Stephen Yagman (born 1944), American lawyer
 Stephen Yakubu (born 1966), Ghanaian politician
 Stephen Yarwood (born 1971), Australian urban futurist
 Steven Yates (born 1983), New Zealand rugby union player
 Steven Yawson (born 1999), English football player
 Steven Yeun (born 1983), South Korean-American actor
 Steven Youngbauer (born 1950), American lawyer

Z 
 Stephen Zack (born 1992), American basketball player
 Stephen N. Zack (born 1947), American lawyer and former bar president
 Steven James Zahn (born 1967), American actor and comedian
 Steven Zaillian (born 1953), American screenwriter, director, film editor, and producer
 Steven Zalewski (born 1986), American former ice hockey player
 Steven Zaloga (born 1952), American author and defense consultant
 Stephen Zappala Sr. (1932–2021), American state judge
 Stephen Zappala Jr., American politician and attorney 
 Stephen Zarlenga (1941–2017), American economics researcher and author
 Stephen Zeh, American basket weaver 
 Steven Zelich (born 1961), American convicted murderer and a former police officer
 Steven Zhang (disambiguation), multiple people
 Stephen Ziliak (born 1963), American professor of economics and author
 Stephen Anthony Zimmerman (born 1949), British financier
 Steven C. Zimmerman (born 1957), American chemistry professor and administrator
 Stephen Eric Zimmerman Jr. (born 1996), American basketball player
 Steven Zirnkilton (born 1958), American voice actor and former politician
 Steven Zuber (born 1991), Swiss footballer 
 Steven Zucker (1949–2019), American mathematician and educator
 Stephen Edward Zuckerman (born 1947), American television and theater director
 Stephen Zunes (born 1956), American international relations scholar and author

Fictional characters 
 Stephen, an engine based on Stephenson's Rocket in the TV series Thomas & Friends.
 Steven Crain, a character in the Netflix series The Haunting of Hill House (TV series)
 Stephen Dedalus, a character in the novels A Portrait of the Artist as a Young Man and Ulysses by James Joyce
 Stephen "Steve" Dierks, a pawn shop owner and one of the main characters in the 2020 movie Hocked
 Stephen Falken, a character in the film WarGames
 Steven Fraser, a character in the film Cyberbully
 Steve Haines, a character from Grand Theft Auto V
 Steven Harper, the school principal and protagonist of TV series Boston Public
 Steve Harrington, a character in the Netflix series Stranger Things
 Stephen Hawke, titular character in The Crimes of Stephen Hawke
 Stephen Hull, a character in the Stephen King story The Doctor's Case
 Steven Hyde, a character in the TV series That '70s Show
 Stephen Maturin, one of the two main characters in the homonymous Aubrey–Maturin series by Patrick O'Brian 
 Stephen Nimieri, a refugee character in the 2004 film I Heart Huckabees
 Steven "Steve" Rogers, also known as Captain America, character appearing in American comic books published by Marvel Comics
 Steven Spence, character from Gossip Girl
 Steven Stone, champion and final boss from the Pokémon games Pokemon Ruby, Sapphire, and Emerald and their 3D remakes Pokémon Omega Ruby and Alpha Sapphire
 Stephen Strange, also known as Doctor Strange, the Sorcerer Supreme in the Marvel Universe
 Steven "Steve" Trevor, character in the DC Comics and 1970s television series Wonder Woman
 Dr. Steven Turner, a psychiatrist and father character in the Netflix series Archive 81
 Stephen Warren, a house slave in the film Django Unchained played by Samuel L. Jackson
 Stephen Wilkins, a character in the film Trick 'r Treat
 Steven Quartz Universe, title character in the animated series Steven Universe
 Steven Yeo, a character in the film I Not Stupid Too

Stephen